The Border Legion is a 1930 American pre-Code Western film directed by Otto Brower. It stars Jack Holt, Fay Wray, and Richard Arlen. It is based on the novel with the same title by Zane Grey.

Cast
Jack Holt as Jack Kells
Fay Wray as Joan Randall
Richard Arlen as Jim Cleve
Eugene Pallette as Bunco Davis
Stanley Fields as Hack Gulden
E. H. Calvert as Judge Savin
Ethan Allen as George Randall
Syd Saylor as Shrimp

Production

The railroad scenes were filmed on the Sierra Railroad in Tuolumne County, California.

See also
The Border Legion (1918)
The Border Legion (1924)
The Last Round-Up (1934)

References

External links
The Border Legion at the Internet Movie Database

1930 films
American Western (genre) films
1930 Western (genre) films
Films directed by Otto Brower
Films based on works by Zane Grey
American black-and-white films
1930s English-language films
1930s American films